Kochki is the name of several rural localities (selos, khutors, and villages) in Russia:
Kochki, Altai Krai, a selo in Kochkinsky Selsoviet of Rodinsky District of Altai Krai
Kochki, Belgorod Oblast, a khutor in Gubkinsky District of Belgorod Oblast
Kochki, Ivanovo Oblast, a village in Kineshemsky District of Ivanovo Oblast
Kochki, Novosibirsk Oblast, a selo in Kochkovsky District of Novosibirsk Oblast
Kochki, Omsk Oblast, a village in Protopopovsky Rural Okrug of Lyubinsky District of Omsk Oblast
Kochki, Tver Oblast, a village in Maksatikhinsky District of Tver Oblast